WLEW can refer to:

 WLEW (AM), a radio station (1340 AM) licensed to Bad Axe, Michigan, United States
 WLEW-FM, a radio station (102.1 FM) licensed to Bad Axe, Michigan, United States